Sergio Fernández Álvarez (born 9 February 1975) is a Spanish retired footballer who played as a central defender.

Club career
Fernández was born in León, Castile and León. After playing most of his career in the third division (with a brief unassuming spell in the second with CD Numancia) he arrived at Hércules CF aged 28, and helped to a return to the second level in his second year.

Following the outstanding 2008–09 season, where his club narrowly missed on a La Liga return, negotiations broke down for renovation of Fernández's contract so, in late June 2009, he agreed on a move to fellow league side Real Murcia.

In the 2009–10 campaign, veteran Fernández was a defensive mainstay for Murcia, only missing three league games out of 42, but his team was eventually relegated. Aged 35 he decided to retire, being immediately appointed his last club's director of football; he moved to another former side, Hércules, in the following year, in the same capacity.

On 2 December 2013, Álvarez joined newly appointed Juan Carlos Garrido's staff at Real Betis, following the dismissal of Pepe Mel. On 16 June 2016 he was named sporting director at Deportivo Alavés, recently returned to the top flight.

References

External links

1975 births
Living people
Sportspeople from León, Spain
Spanish footballers
Footballers from Castile and León
Association football defenders
Segunda División players
Segunda División B players
CD Logroñés footballers
Cultural Leonesa footballers
CD Numancia players
CP Almería players
FC Cartagena footballers
Hércules CF players
Real Murcia players
CD Aurrerá de Vitoria footballers